Gawler railway station is located on the Gawler line.

History

Gawler station opened in 1857 as the terminus of the Gawler line. It was built on pastoral land owned by the local parliamentary member of the period. The original platform building was replaced in 1879. Subsequently, a horse-drawn tram serviced Gawler's main street (Murray Street), almost a kilometre away. The tramway handled both passengers and goods, with several goods sidings, and a connection to the main line to facilitate the delivery of locomotives built by James Martin & Co. The railway was extended to Roseworthy and Kapunda in 1860 then to Morgan in 1878.

With the opening of the Barossa Valley line in 1911, Gawler became a junction station, and North Gawler station (now named Gawler Central) was built which eventually led to closure of the tramway. Further branches from both railway lines meant Gawler Station was quite busy. Neither line is now used beyond the metropolitan transit, and the current station contains a kiosk and three platforms. South of the station, lie stabling sidings for Adelaide Metro's rolling stock. The station marks the end of the double track section from Adelaide, with the line becoming single track just north of the station.

The Gawler Lions Club has adopted the station for restoration work. It now houses an art gallery, displaying local artists, and is open on weekends. The club also successfully lobbied for a steam engine built by James Martin & Sons, previously located on Thomas Terrace between the Gawler Oval and Gawler Central stations. The locomotive is also in the process of being restored. An upgrade of the station was completed in March 2012: the heritage train shed was dismantled for restoration off-site, both platforms were upgraded, and a new toilet was installed.

Railway electrification to Gawler began in 2018 and was completed in June 2022 following delays due to the COVID-19 pandemic and the 2022 state election.

Services by platform

In popular culture
The station building has appeared in a number of films and television shows, including The Shiralee and McLeod's Daughters.

References

External links

Flickr gallery

Railway stations in Adelaide
Railway stations in Australia opened in 1857
Gawler, South Australia